Katharina Kepler (née: Guldenmann; 1546 – 13 April 1622) was a woman from Stuttgart, Württemberg, who was the mother of the famous astronomer Johannes Kepler. She was accused of witchcraft in 1615, but was defended by her son and released.

Life
Katharina Kepler was married to Heinrich Kepler and had one daughter and three sons, one of whom was Johannes Kepler. 

In 1615, a witch trial was initiated by Lutherus Einhorn who in his reign as vogt of the Protestant town of Leonberg (1613 - 1629) accused 15 women of sorcery and executed 8 of them. He acted in accordance with the will of the government and the public, which had asked for an investigation of sorcery, and issued an arrest of Katharina Kepler in 1615. Ursula Reinbold had accused Katharina Kepler of giving her a potion after an argument that had made her sick. Johannes Kepler defended his mother himself, with the assistance of his university in Tübingen. One of his student friends, Christopher Besoldus, assisted her juridically. 

Her son took her away to Linz in December 1616. When she returned to Leonberg in the summer of 1620, she was arrested and imprisoned for fourteen months. She was told how she would be tortured, as a means of frightening her, but she refused to confess anything. 

In October 1621, Kepler was able to effect her release. Katharina Kepler died the following year.

Legacy
Rivka Galchen's 2021 novel Everyone Knows Your Mother Is a Witch presents a fictionalized account of Kepler's life story.

References 

 Artikel „Württemberg, Herzogtum - Hexenverfolgungen”
 Diskussionsbeitrag aus der Mailingliste Hexenforschung mit weiteren Links
 Abbildung des Aktenauszugs aus dem Prozess
 Kurt Baschwitz: Hexen und Hexenprozesse, C. Bertelsmann Verlag, München, 1990, S. 252 - 260
 Berthold Sutter: Der Hexenprozeß gegen Katharina Kepler, Weil der Stadt, Kepler-Ges., 1979

1546 births
1622 deaths
Johannes Kepler
People from Leonberg
People from the Duchy of Württemberg
16th-century German people
17th-century German people
Witch trials in Germany